Martin Heidegger (26 September 188926 May 1976) was a German philosopher who is best known for contributions to phenomenology, hermeneutics, and existentialism. He is among  the most important and influential philosophers of the 20th century. He has been widely criticized for supporting the Nazi Party after his election as rector at the University of Freiburg in 1933, and there has been controversy about the relationship between his philosophy and Nazism.

In Heidegger's fundamental text Being and Time (1927), "Dasein" is introduced as a term for the type of being that humans possess. Dasein has been translated as "being there". Heidegger believes that Dasein already has a "pre-ontological" and non-abstract understanding that shapes how it lives. This mode of being he terms "being-in-the-world". Dasein and "being-in-the-world" are unitary concepts at odds with rationalist philosophy and its "subject/object" view since at least René Descartes. Heidegger explicitly disagrees with Descartes, and  uses an analysis of Dasein to approach the question of the meaning of being. This meaning is  "concerned with what makes beings intelligible as beings", according to Heidegger scholar Michael Wheeler.

Biography

Early years

Heidegger was born in rural Meßkirch, Baden, the son of Johanna (Kempf) and Friedrich Heidegger. Raised a Roman Catholic, he was the son of the sexton of the village church that adhered to the First Vatican Council of 1870, which was observed mainly by the poorer class of Meßkirch. His family could not afford to send him to university, so he entered a Jesuit seminary, though he was turned away within weeks because of the health requirement and what the director and doctor of the seminary described as a psychosomatic heart condition. Heidegger was short and sinewy, with dark piercing eyes. He enjoyed outdoor pursuits, being especially proficient at skiing.

Studying theology at the University of Freiburg while supported by the church, he later switched his field of study to philosophy. Heidegger completed his doctoral thesis on psychologism in 1914, influenced by Neo-Thomism and Neo-Kantianism, directed by Arthur Schneider. In 1916, he finished his venia legendi with a habilitation thesis on Duns Scotus directed by the Neo-Kantian Heinrich Rickert and influenced by Edmund Husserl's phenomenology.

In the two years following, he worked first as an unsalaried Privatdozent then served as a soldier during the final year of World War I; serving "the last ten months of the war" with "the last three of those in a meteorological unit on the western front".

Heidegger taught courses at the University of Freiburg from 1919-1923. See his published courses in Gesamtausgabe. Early Freiburg lecture courses, 1919–1923.

Marburg
In 1923, Heidegger was elected to an extraordinary professorship in philosophy at the University of Marburg. His colleagues there included Rudolf Bultmann, Nicolai Hartmann, Paul Tillich, and Paul Natorp. Heidegger's students at Marburg included Hans-Georg Gadamer, Hannah Arendt, Karl Löwith, Gerhard Krüger, Leo Strauss, Jacob Klein, Günther Anders, and Hans Jonas. Following on from Aristotle, he began to develop in his lectures the main theme of his philosophy: the question of the sense of being. He extended the concept of subject to the dimension of history and concrete existence, which he found prefigured in such Christian thinkers as Paul of Tarsus, Augustine of Hippo, Martin Luther, and Søren Kierkegaard. He also read the works of Wilhelm Dilthey, Husserl, Max Scheler, and Friedrich Nietzsche.

Freiburg
In 1927 Heidegger published his main work, Sein und Zeit (Being and Time). When Husserl retired as Professor of Philosophy in 1928, Heidegger accepted Freiburg's election to be his successor, in spite of a counter-offer by Marburg. Heidegger remained at Freiburg im Breisgau for the rest of his life, declining later offers including one from Humboldt University of Berlin. His students at Freiburg included Hannah Arendt, Günther Anders, Hans Jonas, Karl Löwith, Charles Malik, Herbert Marcuse, and Ernst Nolte. Karl Rahner likely attended four of his seminars in four semesters from 1934 to 1936. Emmanuel Levinas attended his lecture courses during his stay in Freiburg in 1928, as did Jan Patočka in 1933; Patočka in particular was deeply influenced by him.

Heidegger was elected rector of the University on 21 April 1933, and joined the Nazi Party on 1 May. During his time as rector he was a member and an enthusiastic supporter of the party. There is continuing controversy as to the relationship between his philosophy and his political allegiance to Nazism. He wanted to position himself as the philosopher of the party, but the highly abstract nature of his work and the opposition of Alfred Rosenberg, who himself aspired to act in that position, limited Heidegger's role. His withdrawal from his position as rector owed more to his frustration as an administrator than to any principled opposition to the Nazis, according to historians. In his inaugural address as rector on 27 May he expressed his support of a German revolution, and in an article and a speech to the students from the same year he also supported Adolf Hitler. In November 1933, Heidegger signed the Vow of allegiance of the Professors of the German Universities and High-Schools to Adolf Hitler and the National Socialistic State.

Heidegger resigned from the rectorate in April 1934, but remained a member of the Nazi Party until 1945 even though the Nazis eventually prevented him from publishing. From 1936 to 1940, Heidegger delivered a series of lectures on Nietzsche at Freiburg that presented much of the raw material incorporated in his more established work and thought from this time. Of this series, Heidegger said in his 1966 interview with Der Spiegel: "Everyone who had ears to hear was able to hear in these lectures... a confrontation with National Socialism." Later scholars, however, have come to the opposite conclusion about this material; for example David Farrell Krell, in the introduction to an English translation of the seminar, writes: "The problem is not that Heidegger lacked a political theory and praxis but that he had one."

In the autumn of 1944, Heidegger was drafted into the Volkssturm and assigned to dig anti-tank ditches along the Rhine.

Heidegger's Black Notebooks, written between 1931 and into the early 1970s and first published in 2014, contain several expressions of anti-semitic sentiments, which have led to a reevaluation of Heidegger's relation to Nazism. Having analysed the Black Notebooks, Donatella di Cesare asserts in her book Heidegger and the Jews that "metaphysical anti-semitism" and antipathy toward Jews was central to Heidegger's philosophical work. Heidegger, according to di Cesare, considered Jewish people to be agents of modernity disfiguring the spirit of Western civilization; he held the Holocaust to be the logical result of the Jewish acceleration of technology, and thus blamed the Jewish genocide on its victims themselves.

Post-war
In late 1946, as France engaged in épuration légale in its occupation zone, the French military authorities determined that Heidegger should be blocked from teaching or participating in any university activities because of his association with the Nazi Party. The denazification procedures against Heidegger continued until March 1949 when he was finally pronounced a Mitläufer (the second lowest of five categories of "incrimination" by association with the Nazi regime). No punitive measures against him were proposed. This opened the way for his readmission to teaching at Freiburg University in the winter semester of 1950–51. He was granted emeritus status and then taught regularly from 1951 until 1958, and by invitation until 1967.

Death 
Heidegger died on 26 May 1976 in Meßkirch and was buried in the Meßkirch cemetery.

Personal life 

Heidegger married Elfride Petri on 21 March 1917, in a Catholic ceremony officiated by his friend , and a week later in a Protestant ceremony in the presence of her parents. Their first son, Jörg, was born in 1919. Heidegger knew that he was not Hermann's biological father but raised him as his son. Hermann's biological father, who became godfather to his son, was family friend and doctor Friedel Caesar. Hermann was told of this at the age of 14; Hermann became a historian and would later serve as the executor of Heidegger's will. Hermann Heidegger died on 13 January 2020.

Heidegger spent much time at his vacation home at Todtnauberg, on the edge of the Black Forest. He considered the seclusion provided by the forest to be the best environment in which to engage in philosophical thought.

A few months before his death, he met with Bernhard Welte, a Catholic priest, Freiburg University professor and earlier correspondent. The exact nature of their conversation is not known, but what is known is that it included talk of Heidegger's relationship to the Catholic Church and subsequent Christian burial at which the priest officiated.

Affairs
Heidegger had a four-year affair with Hannah Arendt and a decades-long affair with Elisabeth Blochmann; both women were his students. Arendt was Jewish, and Blochmann had one Jewish parent, making them subject to severe persecution by the Nazi authorities. 

The 35-year-old Heidegger, who was married with two young sons, began a long romantic relationship with 17-year-old Arendt  who later faced criticism for this because of Heidegger's support for the Nazi Party after his election as rector at the University of Freiburg in 1933. They agreed to keep the details of the relationship a secret, preserving their letters but keeping them unavailable. The relationship was not known until Elisabeth Young-Bruehl's biography of Arendt appeared in 1982. At the time of publishing, Arendt and Heidegger were deceased and Heidegger's wife, Elfride (1893–1992), was still alive. The affair was not widely known until 1995, when Elzbieta Ettinger gained access to the sealed correspondence.

It is probably fair to say that, following his relationship with Hannah Arendt, Blochmann had one of the most important extramarital affairs with Heidegger (as is known since 2005, Heidegger led something of an open marriage and his wife Elfriede both knew about his affairs and conducted her own). Elfriede Heidegger and Elisabeth Blochmann were friends and former classmates. The story is well documented in the 1989 edition of their letters, starting in 1918. Heidegger's letters to his wife contain information about several other affairs of his. He helped Blochmann emigrate from Germany before the start of World War II and resumed contact with both of them after the war.

Philosophy

Dasein
In the 1927 Being and Time, Heidegger rejects the Cartesian view of the human being as a subjective spectator of objects, according to Marcella Horrigan-Kelly (et al.). The book instead holds that both subject and object are inseparable. In presenting "being" as inseparable, Heidegger introduced the term Dasein (literally: being there), intended to embody a "living being" through their activity of "being there" and "being-in-the-world". "Famously, Heidegger writes of Dasein as Being-in-the-world," according to Michael Wheeler (2011). Understood as a unitary phenomenon rather than a contingent, additive combination, being-in-the-world is an essential characteristic of Dasein, Wheeler writes.

Heidegger's account of Dasein in Being and Time passes through a dissection of the experiences of Angst, "the Nothing" and mortality, and then through an analysis of the structure of "Care" as such. From there he raises the problem of "authenticity", that is, the potentiality for mortal Dasein to exist fully enough that it might actually understand being and its possibilities. Dasein is not "man", but is nothing other than "man", according to Heidegger. Moreover, he wrote that Dasein is "the being that will give access to the question of the meaning of Being".

Being
Dasein's ordinary and even mundane experience of "being-in-the-world" provides "access to the meaning" or "sense of being" (Sinn des Seins). This access via Dasein is also that "in terms of which something becomes intelligible as something." Heidegger proposes that this meaning would elucidate ordinary "prescientific" understanding, which precedes abstract ways of knowing, such as logic or theory.

This supposed "non-linguistic, pre-cognitive access"  to the meaning of Being didn't underscore any particular, preferred narrative, according to an account of Richard Rorty's analysis by Edward Grippe. In this account, Heidegger holds that no particular understanding of Being (nor state of Dasein and its endeavors) is to be preferred over another. Moreover, "Rorty agrees with Heidegger that there is no hidden power called Being," Grippe writes, adding that Heidegger's concept of Being is viewed by Rorty as metaphorical.

But Heidegger actually offers "no sense of how we might answer the question of being as such," writes Simon Critchley in his 2009 nine-part blog commentary on the work for The Guardian. The book instead provides "an answer to the question of what it means to be human," according to Critchley. Nonetheless, Heidegger does present the concept: "'Being' is not something like a being but is rather "what determines beings as beings."  
The interpreters Thomas Sheehan and Mark Wrathall each separately assert that commentators' emphasis on the term "Being" is misplaced, and that Heidegger's central focus was never on "Being" as such. Wrathall wrote (2011) that Heidegger's elaborate concept of "unconcealment" was his central, life-long focus, while  Sheehan (2015) proposed that the philosopher's prime focus was on that which "brings about being as a givenness of entities." Heidegger claims that traditional ontology has prejudicially overlooked the question of being.

Time
Heidegger believes that time finds its meaning in death, according to Michael Kelley.  That is, time is understood only from a finite or mortal vantage. Dasein's essential mode of being-in-the-world is temporal: Having been "thrown" into a world implies a “pastness” to its being. Dasein occupies itself with the present tasks required by goals it has projected on the future. Thus Heidegger concludes that Dasein's fundamental characteristic is temporality, Kelley writes.

Dasein as an inseparable subject/object, cannot be separated from its objective "historicality". On the one hand, Dasein is "stretched along" between birth and death, and thrown into its world; into its possibilities which Dasein is charged with assuming. On the other hand, Dasein's access to this world and these possibilities is always via a history and a tradition—this is the question of "world historicality".

Ontological difference and fundamental ontology 

In Being and Time,"Heidegger drew a sharp distinction between ontical and the ontological -- or beings and "Being" as such. He labelled this the "Ontological Difference". It is from this distinction that he developed the concept of "Fundamental Ontology".

According to Taylor Carman (2003), traditional ontology asks "Why is there anything?" whereas Heidegger's "Fundamental Ontology" asks "What does it mean for something to be?". Heidegger's ontology "is fundamental relative to traditional ontology in that it concerns what any understanding of entities necessarily presupposes, namely, our understanding of that in virtue of which entities are entities", Carman writes.

This line of inquiry is based on the "ontological difference"—central to Heidegger's philosophy. In 1937's "Contributions to Philosophy" Heidegger calls the ontological difference "the essence of Dasein". 
He accuses the Western philosophical tradition of incorrectly focusing on the "ontic"—and thus forgetful of this distinction. This has led to the mistake of understanding being as such as a kind of ultimate entity, for example as idea, energeia, substantia, actualitas or will to power. According to Richard Rorty, Heidegger envisioned no "hidden power of Being" as an ultimate entity. Heidegger purportedly modifies "traditional" ontic philosophy by focusing instead on the meaning of being—or what he called "fundamental ontology". This "ontological inquiry" is required to understand the basis of the sciences, according to "Being and Time" (1927).

This inquiry is engaged by studying the human being, or Dasein, according to Heidegger. This method works because of Dasein's pre-ontological understanding of being that shapes experience. This implicit understanding can be made explicit through phenomenology and its methods, but these must be employed using hermeneutics in order to avoid distortions by the forgetfulness of being, according to  interpretations of Heidegger.

Fundamental Ontology, regarded as a project, is akin to contemporary meta-ontology.

Later works: The Turn

Heidegger's Kehre, or "the turn" (die Kehre)  refers to a change in his work as early as 1930 that became clearly established by the 1940s, according to various commentators. Heidegger rarely used the term. Recurring themes include poetry and technology. Commentators such as William J. Richardson (1963) describe, variously, a shift of focus, or a major change in outlook.

The 1935  Introduction to Metaphysics "clearly shows the shift" to an emphasis on language from a previous emphasis on Dasein in Being and Time eight years earlier, according to Brian Bard's 1993 essay titled "Heidegger's Reading of Heraclitus".  In a 1950 lecture Heidegger formulated the famous saying "Language speaks", later published in the 1959 essays collection Unterwegs zur Sprache, and collected in the 1971 English book Poetry, Language, Thought.

This supposed shift—applied here to cover about thirty years of Heidegger's 40-year writing career—has been described by commentators from widely varied viewpoints; including as a shift in priority from Being and Time to Time and Being—namely, from dwelling (being) in the world to doing (time) in the world. (This aspect, in particular the 1951 essay "Building, Dwelling Thinking" influenced architectural theorists including Christian Norberg-Schulz, Dalibor Vesely, Joseph Rykwert, Daniel Libeskind and the philosopher-architect Nader El-Bizri.)

Other interpreters believe "the Kehre" can be overstated or even that it doesn't exist. Thomas Sheehan (2001) believes this supposed change is "far less dramatic than usually suggested," and entailed a change in focus and method. Sheehan contends that throughout his career, Heidegger never focused on "being", but rather tried to define "[that which] brings about being as a givenness of entities."  Mark Wrathall argued (2011) that the Kehre isn't found in Heidegger's writings but is simply a misconception. As evidence for this view, Wrathall sees a consistency of purpose in Heidegger's life-long pursuit and refinement of his notion of "unconcealment".

Some notable "later" works are The Origin of the Work of Art", (1935), Contributions to Philosophy (1937), Letter on Humanism (1946).  "Building Dwelling Thinking", (1951), "The Question Concerning Technology", (1954) " and What Is Called Thinking? (1954). Also during this period, Heidegger wrote extensively on Nietzsche and the poet Holderlin.

Heidegger and the ground of history

In his later philosophy, Heidegger attempted to reconstruct the "history of being" in order to show how the different epochs in the history of philosophy were dominated by different conceptions of being. His goal is to retrieve the original experience of being present in the early Greek thought that was covered up by later philosophers.

Michael Allen Gillespie says (1984)  that Heidegger's theoretical acceptance of "destiny" has much in common with the millenarianism of Marxism. But Marxists believe Heidegger's "theoretical acceptance is antagonistic to practical political activity and implies fascism. Gillespie, however, says "the real danger" from Heidegger isn't quietism but fanaticism. "History, as Heidegger understands it, doesn't move forward gradually and regularly but spasmodically and unpredictably." Modernity has cast mankind toward a new goal "on the brink of profound nihilism" that is "so alien it requires the construction of a new tradition to make it comprehensible."

Allen extrapolated from Heidegger's writings that mankind may degenerate into scientists, workers and brutes. According to Allen, Heidegger envisaged this abyss to be the greatest event in the West's history because it would enable Humanity to comprehend Being more profoundly and primordially than the Pre-Socratics.

Influences

Augustine of Hippo
Heidegger was substantially influenced by Augustine of Hippo, and Being and Time would not have been possible without the influence of Augustine's thought. Augustine's Confessions was particularly influential in shaping Heidegger's thought. Almost all central concepts of Being and Time are derived from Augustine, Luther, and Kierkegaard, according to Christian Lotz.

Augustine viewed time as relative and subjective, and that being and time were bound up together. Heidegger adopted similar views, e.g. that time was the horizon of Being: ' ...time temporalizes itself only as long as there are human beings.'

Aristotle and the Greeks
Heidegger was influenced at an early age by Aristotle, mediated through Catholic theology, medieval philosophy and Franz Brentano. Aristotle's ethical, logical, and metaphysical works were crucial to the development of his thought in the crucial period of the 1920s. Although he later worked less on Aristotle, Heidegger recommended postponing reading Nietzsche, and to "first study Aristotle for ten to fifteen years". In reading Aristotle, Heidegger increasingly contested the traditional Latin translation and scholastic interpretation of his thought. Particularly important (not least for its influence upon others, both in their interpretation of Aristotle and in rehabilitating a neo-Aristotelian "practical philosophy") was his radical reinterpretation of Book Six of Aristotle's Nicomachean Ethics and several books of the Metaphysics. Both informed the argument of Being and Time. Heidegger's thought is original in being an authentic retrieval of the past, a repetition of the possibilities handed down by the tradition.

The idea of asking about being may be traced back via Aristotle to Parmenides. Heidegger claimed to have revived the question of being, the question having been largely forgotten by the metaphysical tradition extending from Plato to Descartes, a forgetfulness extending to the Age of Enlightenment and then to modern science and technology. In pursuit of the retrieval of this question, Heidegger spent considerable time reflecting on ancient Greek thought, in particular on Plato, Parmenides, Heraclitus, and Anaximander, as well as on the tragic playwright Sophocles.

According to W. Julian Korab-Karpowicz, Heidegger believed "the thinking of  Heraclitus and Parmenides, which lies at the origin of philosophy, was falsified and misinterpreted" by Plato and Aristotle, thus tainting all of subsequent Western philosophy. In his Introduction to Metaphysics, Heidegger states:

Among the most ancient Greek thinkers, it is Heraclitus who was subjected to the most fundamentally un-Greek misinterpretation in the course of Western history, and who nevertheless in more recent times has provided the strongest impulses toward redisclosing what is authentically Greek.

Charles Guignon wrote that Heidegger aimed to correct this misunderstanding by reviving Presocratic notions of 'being' with an emphasis on "understanding the way beings show up in (and as) an unfolding happening or event."  Guignon adds that "we might call this alternative outlook 'event ontology.'"

Dilthey

Heidegger's very early project of developing a "hermeneutics of factical life" and his hermeneutical transformation of phenomenology was influenced in part by his reading of the works of Wilhelm Dilthey.

Of the influence of Dilthey, Hans-Georg Gadamer writes that Dilthey's influence was important in helping the youthful Heidegger "in distancing himself from the systematic ideal of Neo-Kantianism, as Heidegger acknowledges in Being and Time."

Scholars as diverse as Theodore Kisiel and David Farrell Krell have argued for the importance of Diltheyan concepts and strategies in the formation of Heidegger's thought.

Even though Gadamer's interpretation of Heidegger has been questioned, there is little doubt that Heidegger seized upon Dilthey's concept of hermeneutics. Heidegger's novel ideas about ontology required a gestalt formation, not merely a series of logical arguments, in order to demonstrate his fundamentally new paradigm of thinking, and the hermeneutic circle offered a new and powerful tool for the articulation and realization of these ideas.

Husserl

Husserl's influence on Heidegger is controversial. Disagreements centre upon how much of Husserlian phenomenology is contested by Heidegger, and how much his phenomenology in fact informs Heidegger's own understanding. On the relation between the two figures, Gadamer wrote: "When asked about phenomenology, Husserl was quite right to answer as he used to in the period directly after World War I: 'Phenomenology, that is me and Heidegger'." Nevertheless, Gadamer noted that Heidegger was no patient collaborator with Husserl, and that Heidegger's "rash ascent to the top, the incomparable fascination he aroused, and his stormy temperament surely must have made Husserl, the patient one, as suspicious of Heidegger as he always had been of Max Scheler's volcanic fire."

Robert J. Dostal understood the importance of Husserl to be profound:
Heidegger himself, who is supposed to have broken with Husserl, bases his hermeneutics on an account of time that not only parallels Husserl's account in many ways but seems to have been arrived at through the same phenomenological method as was used by Husserl.... The differences between Husserl and Heidegger are significant, but if we do not see how much it is the case that Husserlian phenomenology provides the framework for Heidegger's approach, we will not be able to appreciate the exact nature of Heidegger's project in Being and Time or why he left it unfinished.

Daniel O. Dahlstrom saw Heidegger's presentation of his work as a departure from Husserl as unfairly misrepresenting Husserl's own work. Dahlstrom concluded his consideration of the relation between Heidegger and Husserl as follows:

Heidegger's silence about the stark similarities between his account of temporality and Husserl's investigation of internal time-consciousness contributes to a misrepresentation of Husserl's account of intentionality. Contrary to the criticisms Heidegger advances in his lectures, intentionality (and, by implication, the meaning of 'to be') in the final analysis is not construed by Husserl as sheer presence (be it the presence of a fact or object, act or event). Yet for all its "dangerous closeness" to what Heidegger understands by temporality, Husserl's account of internal time-consciousness does differ fundamentally. In Husserl's account the structure of protentions is accorded neither the finitude nor the primacy that Heidegger claims are central to the original future of ecstatic-horizonal temporality.

Kierkegaard

Heideggerians regarded Søren Kierkegaard as, by far, the greatest philosophical contributor to Heidegger's own existentialist concepts. Heidegger's concepts of anxiety (Angst) and mortality draw on Kierkegaard and are indebted to the way in which the latter lays out the importance of our subjective relation to truth, our existence in the face of death, the temporality of existence, and the importance of passionate affirmation of one's individual being-in-the-world.

Patricia J. Huntington claims that Heidegger's book Being and Time continued Kierkegaard's existential goal. Nevertheless, she argues that Heidegger began to distance himself from any existentialist thought.

Calvin Shrag argues Heidegger's early relationship with Kierkegaard as:

Hölderlin and Nietzsche

Friedrich Hölderlin and Friedrich Nietzsche were both important influences on Heidegger, and many of his lecture courses were devoted to one or the other, especially in the 1930s and 1940s. The lectures on Nietzsche focused on fragments posthumously published under the title The Will to Power, rather than on Nietzsche's published works. Heidegger read The Will to Power as the culminating expression of Western metaphysics, and the lectures are a kind of dialogue between the two thinkers.

This is also the case for the lecture courses devoted to the poetry of Friedrich Hölderlin, which became an increasingly central focus of Heidegger's work and thought. Heidegger grants to Hölderlin a singular place within the history of being and the history of Germany, as a herald whose thought is yet to be "heard" in Germany or the West. Many of Heidegger's works from the 1930s onwards include meditations on lines from Hölderlin's poetry, and several of the lecture courses are devoted to the reading of a single poem (see, for example, Hölderlin's Hymn "The Ister").

Heidegger and Eastern thought
Some writers on Heidegger's work see possibilities within it for dialogue with traditions of thought outside of Western philosophy, particularly East Asian thinking. Despite perceived differences between Eastern and Western philosophy, some of Heidegger's later work, particularly "A Dialogue on Language between a Japanese and an Inquirer", does show an interest in initiating such a dialogue. Heidegger himself had contact with a number of leading Japanese intellectuals, including members of the Kyoto School, notably Hajime Tanabe and Kuki Shūzō. Reinhard May refers to Chang Chung-Yuan who stated (in 1977) "Heidegger is the only Western Philosopher who not only intellectually understands Tao, but has intuitively experienced the essence of it as well." May sees great influence of Taoism and Japanese scholars in Heidegger's work, although this influence is not acknowledged by the author. He asserts (1996): "The investigation concludes that Heidegger's work was significantly influenced by East Asian sources. It can be shown, moreover, that in particular instances Heidegger even appropriated wholesale and almost verbatim major ideas from the German translations of Daoist and Zen Buddhist classics. This clandestine textual appropriation of non-Western spirituality, the extent of which has gone undiscovered for so long, seems quite unparalleled, with far-reaching implications for our future interpretation of Heidegger's work."

Islam
Heidegger has been influential in research on the relationship between Western philosophy and the history of ideas in Islam, particularly for some scholars interested in Arabic philosophical medieval sources. These include the Lebanese philosopher and architectural theorist Nader El-Bizri, who, as well as focusing on the critique of the history of metaphysics (as an 'Arab Heideggerian'), also moves towards rethinking the notion of "dwelling" in the epoch of the modern unfolding of the essence of technology and Gestell, and realizing what can be described as a "confluence of Western and Eastern thought" as well.  El-Bizri has also taken a new direction in his engagement in 'Heidegger Studies' by way of probing the Arab/Levantine Anglophone reception of Sein und Zeit in 1937 as set in the Harvard doctoral thesis of the 20th century Lebanese thinker and diplomat Charles Malik.

It is also claimed that the works of counter-enlightenment philosophers such as Heidegger, along with Friedrich Nietzsche and Joseph de Maistre, influenced Iran's Shia Islamist scholars, notably Ali Shariati. A clearer impact of Heidegger in Iran is associated with thinkers such as Reza Davari Ardakani, Ahmad Fardid, and Fardid's student Jalal Al-e-Ahmad, who have been closely associated with the unfolding of philosophical thinking in a Muslim modern theological legacy in Iran. This included the construction of the ideological foundations of the Iranian Revolution and modern political Islam in its connections with theology.

Heidegger and the Nazi Party

The rectorate

Adolf Hitler was sworn in as Chancellor of Germany on 30 January 1933. Heidegger was elected rector of the University of Freiburg on 21 April 1933, and assumed the position the following day. On May 1, he joined the Nazi Party.

On 27 May 1933, Heidegger delivered his inaugural address, the Rektoratsrede ("The Self-assertion of the German University"), in a hall decorated with swastikas, with members of the Sturmabteilung and prominent Nazi Party officials present.

His tenure as rector was fraught with difficulties from the outset. Some Nazi education officials viewed him as a rival, while others saw his efforts as comical. Some of Heidegger's fellow Nazis also ridiculed his philosophical writings as gibberish. He finally offered his resignation as rector on 23 April 1934, and it was accepted on 27 April. Heidegger remained a member of both the academic faculty and of the Nazi Party until the end of the war.

Philosophical historian Hans Sluga wrote:

Though as rector he prevented students from displaying an anti-Semitic poster at the entrance to the university and from holding a book burning, he kept in close contact with the Nazi student leaders and clearly signaled to them his sympathy with their activism.

In 1945, Heidegger wrote of his term as rector, giving the writing to his son Hermann; it was published in 1983:

The rectorate was an attempt to see something in the movement that had come to power, beyond all its failings and crudeness, that was much more far-reaching and that could perhaps one day bring a concentration on the Germans' Western historical essence. It will in no way be denied that at the time I believed in such possibilities and for that reason renounced the actual vocation of thinking in favor of being effective in an official capacity. In no way will what was caused by my own inadequacy in office be played down. But these points of view do not capture what is essential and what moved me to accept the rectorate.

Treatment of Husserl
Beginning in 1917, German-Jewish philosopher Edmund Husserl championed Heidegger's work, and helped Heidegger become his successor for the chair in philosophy at the University of Freiburg in 1928.

On 6 April 1933, the Gauleiter of Baden Province, Robert Wagner, suspended all Jewish government employees, including present and retired faculty at the University of Freiburg. Heidegger's predecessor as rector formally notified Husserl of his "enforced leave of absence" on 14 April 1933.

Heidegger became Rector of the University of Freiburg on 22 April 1933. The following week the national Reich law of 28 April 1933 replaced Reichskommissar Wagner's decree.  The Reich law required the firing of Jewish professors from German universities, including those, such as Husserl, who had converted to Christianity. The termination of the retired professor Husserl's academic privileges thus did not involve any specific action on Heidegger's part.

Heidegger had by then broken off contact with Husserl, other than through intermediaries.  Heidegger later claimed that his relationship with Husserl had already become strained after Husserl publicly "settled accounts" with Heidegger and Max Scheler in the early 1930s.

Heidegger did not attend his former mentor's cremation in 1938. In 1941, under pressure from publisher Max Niemeyer, Heidegger agreed to remove the dedication to Husserl from Being and Time (restored in post-war editions).

Heidegger's behavior towards Husserl has provoked controversy. Hannah Arendt initially suggested that Heidegger's behavior precipitated Husserl's death. She called Heidegger a "potential murderer". However, she later recanted her accusation.

In 1939, only a year after Husserl's death, Heidegger wrote in his Black Notebooks: "The more original and inceptive the coming decisions and questions become, the more inaccessible will they remain to this [Jewish] 'race'. Thus, Husserl's step toward phenomenological observation, and his rejection of psychological explanations and historiological reckoning of opinions, are of enduring importance—yet it never reaches into the domains of essential decisions", seeming to imply that Husserl's philosophy was limited purely because he was Jewish.

Post-rectorate period
After the failure of Heidegger's rectorship, he withdrew from most political activity, but remained a member of the Nazi Party. In May 1934 he accepted a position on the Committee for the Philosophy of Law in the Academy for German Law (Ausschuß für Rechtphilosophie der Akademie für Deutsches Recht), where he remained active until at least 1936. The academy had official consultant status in preparing Nazi legislation such as the Nuremberg racial laws that came into effect in 1935. In addition to Heidegger, such Nazi notables as Hans Frank, Julius Streicher, Carl Schmitt and Alfred Rosenberg belonged to the Academy and served on this committee.

In a 1935 lecture, later published in 1953 as part of the book Introduction to Metaphysics, Heidegger refers to the "inner truth and greatness" of the Nazi movement (die innere Wahrheit und Größe dieser Bewegung), but he then adds a qualifying statement in parentheses: "namely, the confrontation of planetary technology and modern humanity" (nämlich die Begegnung der planetarisch bestimmten Technik und des neuzeitlichen Menschen). However, it subsequently transpired that this qualification had not been made during the original lecture, although Heidegger claimed that it had been. This has led scholars to argue that Heidegger still supported the Nazi party in 1935 but that he did not want to admit this after the war, and so he attempted to silently correct his earlier statement.

In private notes written in 1939, Heidegger took a strongly critical view of Hitler's ideology; however, in public lectures, he seems to have continued to make ambiguous comments which, if they expressed criticism of the regime, did so only in the context of praising its ideals. For instance, in a 1942 lecture, published posthumously, Heidegger said of recent German classics scholarship:

In the majority of "research results," the Greeks appear as pure National Socialists. This overenthusiasm on the part of academics seems not even to notice that with such "results" it does National Socialism and its historical uniqueness no service at all, not that it needs this anyhow.

An important witness to Heidegger's continued allegiance to Nazism during the post-rectorship period is his former student Karl Löwith, who met Heidegger in 1936 while Heidegger was visiting Rome. In an account set down in 1940 (though not intended for publication), Löwith recalled that Heidegger wore a swastika pin to their meeting, though Heidegger knew that Löwith was Jewish. Löwith also recalled that Heidegger "left no doubt about his faith in Hitler", and stated that his support for Nazism was in agreement with the essence of his philosophy.

Heidegger rejected the "biologically grounded racism" of the Nazis, replacing it with linguistic-historical heritage.

Post-war period
After the end of World War II, Heidegger was summoned to appear at a denazification hearing. Heidegger's former lover Hannah Arendt spoke on his behalf at this hearing, while Karl Jaspers spoke against him. He was charged on four counts, dismissed from the university and declared a "follower" (Mitläufer) of Nazism. Heidegger was forbidden to teach between 1945 and 1951. One consequence of this teaching ban was that Heidegger began to engage far more in the French philosophical scene.

In his postwar thinking, Heidegger distanced himself from Nazism, but his critical comments about Nazism seem "scandalous" to some since they tend to equate the Nazi war atrocities with other inhumane practices related to rationalisation and industrialisation, including the treatment of animals by factory farming. For instance in a lecture delivered at Bremen in 1949, Heidegger said: "Agriculture is now a motorized food industry, the same thing in its essence as the production of corpses in the gas chambers and the extermination camps, the same thing as blockades and the reduction of countries to famine, the same thing as the manufacture of hydrogen bombs."

In 1967 Heidegger met with the Jewish poet Paul Celan, a concentration camp survivor. Having corresponded since 1956, Celan visited Heidegger at his country retreat and wrote an enigmatic poem about the meeting, which some interpret as Celan's wish for Heidegger to apologize for his behavior during the Nazi era.

Der Spiegel interview
On 23 September 1966, Heidegger was interviewed by Rudolf Augstein and Georg Wolff for Der Spiegel magazine, in which he agreed to discuss his political past provided that the interview be published posthumously. ("Only a God Can Save Us" was published five days after his death, on 31 May 1976.) In the interview, Heidegger defended his entanglement with Nazism in two ways: first, he argued that there was no alternative, saying that he was trying to save the university (and science in general) from being politicized and thus had to compromise with the Nazi administration. Second, he admitted that he saw an "awakening" (Aufbruch) which might help to find a "new national and social approach," but said that he changed his mind about this in 1934, largely prompted by the violence of the Night of the Long Knives.

In his interview Heidegger defended as double-speak his 1935 lecture describing the "inner truth and greatness of this movement." He affirmed that Nazi informants who observed his lectures would understand that by "movement" he meant Nazism. However, Heidegger asserted that his dedicated students would know this statement wasn't praise for the Nazi Party. Rather, he meant it as he expressed it in the parenthetical clarification later added to Introduction to Metaphysics (1953), namely, "the confrontation of planetary technology and modern humanity."

The eyewitness account of Löwith from 1940 contradicts the account given in the Der Spiegel interview in two ways: that he did not make any decisive break with Nazism in 1934, and that Heidegger was willing to entertain more profound relations between his philosophy and political involvement. The Der Spiegel interviewers did not bring up Heidegger's 1949 quotation comparing the industrialization of agriculture to the extermination camps. In fact, the interviewers were not in possession of much of the evidence now known for Heidegger's Nazi sympathies. Der Spiegel journalist Georg Wolff had been an SS-Hauptsturmführer with the Sicherheitsdienst, stationed in Oslo during World War II, and had been writing articles with antisemitic and racist overtones in Der Spiegel since the end of the war.

Influence and reception in France
Heidegger is "widely acknowledged to be one of the most original and important philosophers of the 20th century while remaining one of the most controversial." His ideas have penetrated into many areas, but in France there is a very long and particular history of reading and interpreting his work which in itself resulted in deepening the impact of his thought in Continental Philosophy. He influenced Jean Beaufret, François Fédier, Dominique Janicaud, Jean-Luc Marion, Jean-François Courtine, Jean Paul Sartre, Jacques Derrida, Michel Foucault and others.

Existentialism and pre-war influence
Heidegger's influence on French philosophy began in the 1930s, when Being and Time, "What is Metaphysics?" and other Heideggerian texts were read by Jean-Paul Sartre and other existentialists, as well as by thinkers such as Alexandre Kojève, Georges Bataille and Emmanuel Levinas. Because Heidegger's discussion of ontology (the study of being) is rooted in an analysis of the mode of existence of individual human beings (Da-sein, or there-being), his work has often been associated with existentialism. The influence of Heidegger on Sartre's Being and Nothingness (1943) is marked, but Heidegger felt that Sartre had misread his work, as he argued in later texts such as the "Letter on Humanism". In that text, intended for a French audience, Heidegger explained this misreading in the following terms:

 Sartre's key proposition about the priority of existentia over essentia  [that is, Sartre's statement that "existence precedes essence"] does, however, justify using the name "existentialism" as an appropriate title for a philosophy of this sort. But the basic tenet of "existentialism" has nothing at all in common with the statement from Being and Time [that "the 'essence' of Dasein lies in its existence"]—apart from the fact that in Being and Time no statement about the relation of essentia and existentia can yet be expressed, since there it is still a question of preparing something precursory.

"Letter on 'Humanism'" is often seen as a direct response to Sartre's 1945 lecture "Existentialism Is a Humanism". Aside from merely disputing readings of his own work, however, in the "Letter on Humanism" Heidegger asserts that "Every humanism is either grounded in a metaphysics or is itself made to be the ground of one."  Heidegger's largest issue with Sartre's existential humanism is that, while it does make a humanistic 'move' in privileging existence over essence, "the reversal of a metaphysical statement remains a metaphysical statement." From this point onward in his thought, Heidegger attempted to think beyond metaphysics to a place where the articulation of the fundamental questions of ontology were fundamentally possible: only from this point can we restore (that is, re-give [redonner]) any possible meaning to the word "humanism".

Post-war forays into France
After the war, Heidegger was banned from university teaching for a period on account of his support of Nazism while serving as Rector of Freiburg University. He developed a number of contacts in France, where his work continued to be taught, and a number of French students visited him at Todtnauberg (see, for example, Jean-François Lyotard's brief account in Heidegger and "the Jews", which discusses a Franco-German conference held in Freiburg in 1947, one step toward bringing together French and German students). Heidegger subsequently made several visits to France, and made efforts to keep abreast of developments in French philosophy by way of correspondence with Jean Beaufret, an early French translator of Heidegger, and with Lucien Braun.

Derrida and deconstruction
Deconstruction came to Heidegger's attention in 1967 by way of Lucien Braun's recommendation of Jacques Derrida's work (Hans-Georg Gadamer was present at an initial discussion and indicated to Heidegger that Derrida's work came to his attention by way of an assistant). Heidegger expressed interest in meeting Derrida personally after the latter sent him some of his work. There was a discussion of a meeting in 1972, but this failed to take place. Heidegger's interest in Derrida is said by Braun to have been considerable (as is evident in two letters, of September 29, 1967, and May 16, 1972, from Heidegger to Braun). Braun also brought to Heidegger's attention the work of Michel Foucault. Foucault's relation to Heidegger is a matter of considerable difficulty; Foucault acknowledged Heidegger as a philosopher whom he read but never wrote about. (For more on this see Penser à Strasbourg, Jacques Derrida, et al., which includes reproductions of both letters and an account by Braun, "À mi-chemin entre Heidegger et Derrida").

Derrida attempted to displace the understanding of Heidegger's work that had been prevalent in France from the period of the ban against Heidegger teaching in German universities, which amounted to an almost wholesale rejection of the influence of Jean-Paul Sartre and existentialist terms. In Derrida's view, deconstruction is a tradition inherited via Heidegger (the French term "déconstruction" is a term coined to translate Heidegger's use of the words "Destruktion"—literally "destruction"—and "Abbau"—more literally "de-building"). According to Derrida, Sartre's interpretation of Dasein and other key Heideggerian concerns is overly psychologistic, anthropocentric, and misses the historicality central to Dasein in Being and Time.

The Farías debate
Jacques Derrida, Philippe Lacoue-Labarthe, and Jean-François Lyotard, among others, all engaged in debate and disagreement about the relation between Heidegger's philosophy and his Nazi politics. These debates included the question of whether it was possible to do without Heidegger's philosophy, a position which Derrida in particular rejected. Forums where these debates took place include the proceedings of the first conference dedicated to Derrida's work, published as "Les Fins de l'homme à partir du travail de Jacques Derrida: colloque de Cerisy, 23 juillet-2 août 1980", Derrida's "Feu la cendre/cio' che resta del fuoco", and the studies on Paul Celan by Lacoue-Labarthe and Derrida which shortly preceded the detailed studies of Heidegger's politics published in and after 1987.

When in 1987 Víctor Farías published his book Heidegger et le nazisme, this debate was taken up by many others, some of whom were inclined to disparage so-called "deconstructionists" for their association with Heidegger's philosophy. Derrida and others not only continued to defend the importance of reading Heidegger, but attacked Farías on the grounds of poor scholarship and for what they saw as the sensationalism of his approach. Not all scholars agreed with this negative assessment: Richard Rorty, for example, declared that "[Farías'] book includes more concrete information relevant to Heidegger's relations with the Nazis than anything else available, and it is an excellent antidote to the evasive apologetics that are still being published."

Bernard Stiegler
More recently, Heidegger's thought has influenced the work of the French philosopher Bernard Stiegler. This is evident even from the title of Stiegler's multi-volume magnum opus, La technique et le temps (volume one translated into English as Technics and Time, 1: The Fault of Epimetheus). Stiegler offers an original reading of Heidegger, arguing that there can be no access to "originary temporality" other than via material, that is, technical, supports, and that Heidegger recognised this in the form of his account of world historicality, yet in the end suppressed that fact. Stiegler understands the existential analytic of Being and Time as an account of psychic individuation, and his later "history of being" as an account of collective individuation. He understands many of the problems of Heidegger's philosophy and politics as the consequence of Heidegger's inability to integrate the two.

Giorgio Agamben
Heidegger has been very influential in the work of the Italian philosopher Giorgio Agamben. Agamben attended seminars in France led by Heidegger in the late 1960s.

Criticism

Early criticisms
According to Husserl, Being and Time claimed to deal with ontology but only did so in the first few pages of the book. Having nothing further to contribute to an ontology independent of human existence, Heidegger changed the topic to Dasein. Whereas Heidegger argued that the question of human existence is central to the pursuit of the question of being, Husserl criticised this as reducing phenomenology to "philosophical anthropology" and offering an abstract and incorrect portrait of the human being.

In 1929 the Neo-Kantian Ernst Cassirer and Heidegger engaged in an influential debate, during the Second Davos Hochschulkurs in Davos, concerning the significance of Kantian notions of freedom and rationality (see Cassirer–Heidegger debate). Whereas Cassirer defended the role of rationality in Kant, Heidegger argued for the priority of the imagination.

Dilthey's student Georg Misch wrote the first extended critical appropriation of Heidegger in Lebensphilosophie und Phänomenologie. Eine Auseinandersetzung der Diltheyschen Richtung mit Heidegger und Husserl, Leipzig 1930 (3rd ed. Stuttgart 1964).

The Young Hegelians and critical theory
Hegel-influenced Marxist thinkers, especially György Lukács and the Frankfurt School, associated the style and content of Heidegger's thought with German irrationalism and criticised its political implications.

Initially, members of the Frankfurt School were positively disposed to Heidegger, becoming more critical at the beginning of the 1930s. Heidegger's student Herbert Marcuse (1928-1932) became associated with the Frankfurt School. Initially striving for a synthesis between Hegelian Marxism and Heidegger's phenomenology, Marcuse later rejected Heidegger's thought for its "false concreteness" and "revolutionary conservatism". Theodor Adorno wrote an extended critique of the ideological character of Heidegger's early and later use of language in the Jargon of Authenticity. Contemporary social theorists associated with the Frankfurt School have remained largely critical of Heidegger's works and influence. In particular, Jürgen Habermas admonishes the influence of Heidegger on recent French philosophy in his polemic against "postmodernism" in The Philosophical Discourse of Modernity (1985). However, work by philosopher and critical theorist Nikolas Kompridis tries to show that Heidegger's insights into world disclosure are badly misunderstood and mishandled by Habermas, and are of vital importance for critical theory, offering an important way of renewing that tradition.

Reception by analytic and Anglo-American philosophy
Criticism of Heidegger's philosophy has also come from analytic philosophy (whose value upon clarity he seemingly did not share) beginning with logical positivism. 

In "The Elimination of Metaphysics Through Logical Analysis of Language" (1932), Rudolf Carnap accused Heidegger of offering an "illusory" ontology, criticising him for committing the fallacy of reification and for wrongly dismissing the logical treatment of language which, according to Carnap, can only lead to writing "nonsensical pseudo-propositions".

The British logical positivist A. J. Ayer was strongly critical of Heidegger's philosophy. In Ayer's view, Heidegger proposed vast, overarching theories regarding existence, which are completely unverifiable through empirical demonstration and logical analysis. For Ayer, this sort of philosophy was a poisonous strain on modern thought. He considered Heidegger to be the worst example of such philosophy, which Ayer believed to be entirely useless. In his Philosophy in the Twentieth Century (1982) Ayer accuses Heidegger of "surprising ignorance" or "unscrupulous distortion" and "what can fairly be described as charlatanism."

Bertrand Russell considered Heidegger an obscurantist, writing, 
Highly eccentric in its terminology, his philosophy is extremely obscure. One cannot help suspecting that language is here running riot. An interesting point in his speculations is the insistence that nothingness is something positive. As with much else in Existentialism, this is a psychological observation made to pass for logic.
This quote expresses the sentiments of many 20th-century analytic philosophers concerning Heidegger.

Roger Scruton stated that:  "His major work Being and Time is formidably difficult—unless it is utter nonsense, in which case it is laughably easy. I am not sure how to judge it, and have read no commentator who even begins to make sense of it".

Apart from the charge of obscurantism, other analytic philosophers considered the actual content of Heidegger's work to be either faulty and meaningless, vapid or uninteresting. Positive evaluations include Gilbert Ryle's a critical yet sympathetic review of Being and Time. And a remark attributed to Ludwig Wittgenstein by Friedrich Waismann: "To be sure, I can imagine what Heidegger means by being and anxiety" has been construed by some commentators as sympathetic to Heidegger's philosophical approach. Positive and negative analytic evaluations have been collected in, for example, Michael Murray's Heidegger and Modern Philosophy: Critical Essays (1978). Heidegger's reputation within English-language philosophy has slightly improved in philosophical terms in some part through the efforts of Hubert Dreyfus, Richard Rorty, and a recent generation of analytically oriented phenomenology scholars. Pragmatist Rorty claimed that Heidegger's approach to philosophy in the first half of his career has much in common with that of the latter-day Ludwig Wittgenstein. Nevertheless, Rorty asserted that what Heidegger had constructed in his writings was a myth of being rather than an account of it.

Contemporary European reception
Although Heidegger is considered by many observers to be one of the most influential philosophers of the 20th century, aspects of his work have been criticised by those who nevertheless acknowledge this influence, such as Hans-Georg Gadamer and Jacques Derrida. Some questions raised about Heidegger's philosophy include the priority of ontology, the status of animals, the nature of the religious, Heidegger's supposed neglect of ethics (Levinas), the body (Maurice Merleau-Ponty), the sexual difference (Luce Irigaray), or space (Peter Sloterdijk).

Levinas was deeply influenced by Heidegger, and yet became one of his fiercest critics, contrasting the infinity of the good beyond being with the immanence and totality of ontology. Levinas also condemned Heidegger's involvement with Nazism, stating: "One can forgive many Germans, but there are some Germans it is difficult to forgive. It is difficult to forgive Heidegger."

Heidegger's defenders, notably Arendt, see his support for Nazism as arguably a personal " 'error' " (a word which Arendt placed in quotation marks when referring to Heidegger's Nazi-era politics). Defenders think this error was irrelevant to Heidegger's philosophy. Critics such as Levinas, Karl Löwith, and Theodor Adorno claim that Heidegger's support for Nazism revealed flaws inherent in his thought.

W. Julian Korab-Karpowicz states in the Internet Encyclopedia of Philosophy that Heidegger's writing is "notoriously difficult", possibly because his thinking was "original" and focused on obscure and innovative topics. He concludes that Being and Time "remains his most influential work".

In film
 Being in the World draws on Heidegger's work to explore what it means to be human in a technological age.  A number of Heidegger scholars are interviewed, including Hubert Dreyfus, Mark Wrathall, Albert Borgmann, John Haugeland and Taylor Carman.
 The Ister (2004) is a film based on Heidegger's 1942 lecture course on Friedrich Hölderlin, and features Jean-Luc Nancy, Philippe Lacoue-Labarthe, Bernard Stiegler, and Hans-Jürgen Syberberg.
 The film director Terrence Malick translated Heidegger's 1929 essay Vom Wesen des Grundes into English. It was published under the title The Essence of Reasons (1969). It is also frequently said of Malick that his cinema has Heideggerian sensibilities.
 The 2006 experimental short Die Entnazifizierung des MH by James T. Hong imagines Heidegger's denazification proceedings.
 In the 2012 film Hannah Arendt, Heidegger is portrayed by actor .

Bibliography

Gesamtausgabe
Heidegger's collected writings are published by Vittorio Klostermann. The Gesamtausgabe was begun during Heidegger's lifetime. He defined the order of publication and dictated that the principle of editing should be "ways not works". Publication has not yet been completed. The current executor of Martin Heidegger’s Literary Estate is his grandson and a lawyer, Arnulf Heidegger (1969- ).

The contents are listed here: Heidegger Gesamtausgabe.

Selected works

See also
 Daseinsanalysis
 Heidegger and Nazism
 Heidegger Gesamtausgabe
 Hermeneutic idealism
 Hölderlin's Hymn "The Ister"
 Khôra
 List of Nazi ideologues
 Object-oriented ontology
 Sous rature

Notes

References

Further reading

On Being and Time
 William Blattner, Heidegger's Temporal Idealism
 Taylor Carman, Heidegger's Analytic: Interpretation, Discourse, and Authenticity in "Being and Time" (2003)  
 Craig J. N. de Paulo, The Influence of Augustine on Heidegger: The Emergence of an Augustinian Phenomenology
 Hubert Dreyfus, Being-in-the-World: A Commentary on Heidegger's Being and Time, Division I
 Michael Gelven, A Commentary on Heidegger's Being and Time, Revised Edition
 E.F. Kaelin, "Heidegger's Being & Time: A Reading for Readers"
 Magda King, A Guide to Heidegger's Being and Time
 Theodore Kisiel, The Genesis of Heidegger's Being and Time
 Stephen Mulhall, Heidegger and Being and Time
 James Luchte, Heidegger's Early Philosophy: The Phenomenology of Ecstatic Temporality
 Mark Wrathall, How to Read Heidegger

Biographies
 Víctor Farías, Heidegger and Nazism, ed. by Joseph Margolis and Tom Rockmore
 Hugo Ott, Martin Heidegger: A Political Life
 Otto Pöggeler, Martin Heidegger's Path of Thinking, trans. by D. Magurshak and S. Barber, Humanities Press, 1987.
 Rüdiger Safranski, Martin Heidegger: Between Good and Evil
 John van Buren, The Young Heidegger: Rumor of the Hidden King

Politics and Nazism
 Pierre Bourdieu, The Political Ontology of Martin Heidegger
 Miguel de Beistegui, Heidegger and the Political: Dystopias
 Jacques Derrida, Of Spirit: Heidegger and the Question
 Víctor Farías, Heidegger and Nazism, Philadelphia, Temple University Press, 1989.
 Emmanuel Faye, Heidegger, l'introduction du nazisme dans la philosophie : autour des séminaires inédits de 1933–1935, Paris, Albin Michel,  2005.  in French language
 Emmanuel Faye, Heidegger. The Introduction of Nazism into Philosophy in Light of the Unpublished Seminars of 1933–1935, Translated by Michael B. Smith, foreword by Tom Rockmore, Yale University Press, 2009, 436 p. Foreword Award: Book of the year 2009 for Philosophy.
 Annemarie Gethmann-Siefert & Otto Pöggeler (eds.), Heidegger und die praktische Philosophie, Frankfurt a. M., Suhrkamp, 1989. in German language
 Dominique Janicaud, The Shadow of That Thought
 W.J. Korab-Karpowicz, "Heidegger's Hidden Path: From Philosophy to Politics", Review of Metaphysics, 61 (2007) 
 Philippe Lacoue-Labarthe, "Transcendence Ends in Politics", in Typography: Mimesis, Philosophy, Politics
 Philippe Lacoue-Labarthe, Heidegger, Art, and Politics: The Fiction of the Political
 George Leaman, Heidegger im Kontext: Gesamtüberblick zum NS-Engagement der Universitätsphilosophen, Argument Verlag, Hamburg, 1993. 
 Karl Löwith, Martin Heidegger and European Nihilism
 Karl Löwith, Heidegger's Existentialism
 Jean-François Lyotard, Heidegger and "the Jews"
Hugo Ott, Heidegger. A Political Life.
 Günther Neske & Emil Kettering (eds.), Martin Heidegger and National Socialism: Questions and Answers
 Political Texts – Rectoral Addresses
 Guillaume Payen, Martin Heidegger's Changing Destinies: Catholicism, Revolution, Nazism. Translated by Jane Marie Todd and Steven Rendall, Yale University Press, 2023.
 Tom Rockmore and Joseph Margolis (ed.), The Heidegger Case
 Daniel Ross, Heidegger and the Question of the Political
 Hans Sluga, Heidegger's Crisis: Philosophy and Politics in Nazi Germany
 Iain Thomson, Heidegger on Ontotheology: Technology and the Politics of Education
 Dana Villa, Arendt and Heidegger:  the Fate of the Political
 Richard Wolin (ed.), The Heidegger Controversy .
 Julian Young, Heidegger, Philosophy, Nazism

Other secondary literature
 Renate Maas, Diaphan und gedichtet. Der künstlerische Raum bei Martin Heidegger und Hans Jantzen, Kassel 2015, 432 pages, 978-3-86219-854-2. 
 Jeffrey Andrew Barash, Martin Heidegger and the Problem of Historical Meaning (New York: Fordham, 2003)
 Robert Bernasconi, Heidegger in Question: The Art of Existing
 Babette Babich, Words in Blood, Like Flowers. Philosophy and Poetry, Music and Eros in Hoelderlin, Nietzsche and Heidegger (2006).  
 Walter A. Brogan, Heidegger and Aristotle: The Twofoldness of Being
 Scott M. Campbell: The Early Heidegger's Philosophy of Life: Facticity, Being, and Language. Fordham University Press, 2012. 
 Richard M. Capobianco, Engaging Heidegger with a foreword by William J. Richardson. University of Toronto Press, 2010.
 Richard M. Capobianco, Heidegger's Way of Being. University of Toronto Press, 2014.
Maxence Caron, Heidegger – Pensée de l'être et origine de la subjectivité, 1760 pages, first and only book on Heidegger awarded by the Académie française.
 Gabriel Cercel and Cristian Ciocan (eds.), The Early Heidegger (Studia Phaenomenologica I, 3–4), Bucharest: Humanitas, 2001, 506 p., including letters by Heidegger and Pöggeler, and articles by Walter Biemel, Friedrich-Wilhelm von Herrmann, Theodore Kisiel, Marion Heinz, Alfred Denker
 Steven Galt Crowell, Husserl, Heidegger, and the Space of Meaning: Paths toward Transcendental Phenomenology
 Walter A. Davis. Inwardness and Existence: Subjectivity in/and Hegel, Heidegger, Marx, and Freud. Madison: University of Wisconsin Press, 1989.
 Jacques Derrida, "Ousia and Gramme: Note on a Note from Being and Time", in Margins of Philosophy
 Hubert L. Dreyfus & Mark A. Wrathall, A Companion to Heidegger (Oxford: Blackwell, 2007)
 Paul Edwards, Heidegger's Confusions
 Nader El-Bizri The Phenomenological Quest Between Avicenna and Heidegger (New York, 2000); reprinted by SUNY Press in 2014
 Christopher Fynsk, Heidegger: Thought and Historicity
 Michael Allen Gillespie,  Hegel, Heidegger, and the Ground of History (University of Chicago Press, 1984)
 Glazebrook, Trish (2000), Heidegger's Philosophy of Science, Fordham University Press.
 Patricia Altenbernd Johnson, On Heidegger (Wadsworth Philosophers Series), Wadsworth Publishing, 1999
 Alan Kim, Plato in Germany: Kant-Natorp-Heidegger (Academia, 2010)
 Philippe Lacoue-Labarthe, Poetry as Experience
 Philippe Lacoue-Labarthe, Heidegger and the Politics of Poetry
 S. J. McGrath, Heidegger. A (Very) Critical Introduction
 William McNeill, The Glance of the Eye: Heidegger, Aristotle, and the Ends of Theory
 William McNeill, The Time of Life: Heidegger and Ethos
 Jean-Luc Nancy, "The Decision of Existence", in The Birth to Presence
 Herman Philipse, Heidegger's Philosophy of Being: A Critical Interpretation
 Richard Polt, Heidegger: An Introduction
 François Raffoul, Heidegger and the Subject
 François Raffoul & David Pettigrew (ed), Heidegger and Practical Philosophy
 François Raffoul & Eric S. Nelson (ed), The Bloomsbury Companion to Heidegger (Bloomsbury, 2013)
 William J. Richardson, Heidegger: Through Phenomenology to Thought.
 John Sallis, Echoes: After Heidegger
 John Sallis (ed), Reading Heidegger: Commemorations, including articles by Robert Bernasconi, Jacques Derrida, Rodolphe Gasché, and John Sallis, among others.
 Reiner Schürmann, Heidegger on Being and Acting: From Principles to Anarchy
 Tony See, Community without Identity: The Ontology and Politics of Heidegger
 Adam Sharr, Heidegger's Hut
 Bernard Stiegler, Technics and Time, 1: The Fault of Epimetheus
 Leo Strauss, "An Introduction to Heideggerian Existentialism", in The Rebirth of Classical Political Rationalism (University of Chicago: 1989).
 Andrzej Warminski, Readings in Interpretation: Hölderlin, Hegel, Heidegger
 Hue Woodson, Heideggerian Theologies: The Pathmarks of John Macquarrie, Rudolf Bultmann, Paul Tillich, and Karl Rahner (Eugene, OR: Wipf and Stock, 2018)
Foster, Stephen (2019) "Theology as Repetition: John Macquarrie in Conversation" (Eugene, OR: Wipf and Stock, 2019)
 Julian Young, Heidegger's Philosophy of Art
 Julian Young, Heidegger's Later Philosophy
 Bastian Zimmermann, Die Offenbarung des Unverfügbaren und die Würde des Fragens. Ethische Dimensionen der Philosophie Martin Heideggers (London: 2010) 
 Sean J. McGrath and Andrzej Wierciński, ed., A Companion to Heidegger's "Phenomenology of Religious Life" (Amsterdam: Rodopi, 2010).
 Gino Zaccaria, The Enigma of Art (Leiden-Boston: Brill, 2021)

Reception in France
 Jean Beaufret, Dialogue avec Heidegger, 4 vols., Paris: Minuit, 1973–1985.
 Jean-François Courtine, Heidegger et la phénoménologie, Paris: Vrin, 1990.
 John E. Drabinski and Eric S. Nelson, eds., Between Levinas and Heidegger, Albany: SUNY Press, 2014.
 Dominique Janicaud, trans. François Raffoul and David Pettigrew, Heidegger en France, 2 vols., Paris: Albin Michel, 2001.
 Ethan Kleinberg, Generation Existential: Heidegger's Philosophy in France, 1927–1961
 David Pettigrew and François Raffoul, eds., French Interpretations of Heidegger: An Exceptional Reception, Albany : SUNY Press, 2006.

Reception in Italy
 Gino Zaccaria, L'etica originaria. Hölderlin, Heidegger e il linguaggio, Milano: Egea, 1992.
 Gino Zaccaria, L'inizio greco del pensiero. Heidegger e l'essenza futura della filosofia, Milano: Marinotti Edizioni, 1999.
 Ivo De Gennaro and Gino Zaccaria, Dasein : Da-sein. Tradurre la parola del pensiero, Milano: Marinotti Edizioni, 2007.
 Gino Zaccaria, Pensare il nulla. Leopardi, Heidegger, Pavia: Ibis, 2015.
 Gino Zaccaria, La provenienza dell'arte. Atena e l'enigma (with the it. translation of a Heidegger's conference on Art), Pavia: Ibis, 2015.
 Gino Zaccaria, The Enigma of Art, Leiden-Boston: Brill, 2021.
 Gino Zaccaria, Meditazioni scismatiche. Il nulla e il tempo, l'infinito e l'arte, Firenze: Olschki, 2022.

Influence on Japanese philosophy
 Mayeda, Graham. 2006. Time, space and ethics in the philosophy of Watsuji Tetsurō, Kuki Shūzō, and Martin Heidegger (New York: Routledge, 2006).  (alk. paper).

Heidegger and Asian philosophy
 Parkes, Graham (1987).  Heidegger and Asian Thought. Honolulu: University of Hawaii Press. 
 May, Reinhard, & Parkes, Graham (1996). Heidegger's Hidden Sources: East Asian influences on his work. London: Routledge. 
 Nelson, Eric S. (2017). Chinese and Buddhist Philosophy in Early Twentieth-Century German Thought London: Bloomsbury.

External links

Archival collections
 Original Heidegger manuscripts are kept at the Loyola University Chicago archives. See also  "The transcripts and photocopies of Martin Heidegger’s writings were given to Barbara Fiand, SNDdeN, Ph.D., by Fritz Heidegger in 1978".
 Martin Heidegger Collection, ca. 1918-1976 
 Guide to the Student Notes from Lectures by Martin Heidegger. Special Collections and Archives, The UC Irvine Libraries, Irvine, California.
 Works by Heidegger and on Heidegger (categorization)
 
 Majority of Heidegger Archives. Online: Deutsches Literaturarchiv in the town of Marbach am Neckar, Germany.  Also known as: DLA - German Literature Archive. Most of Martin Heidegger’s manuscripts are in the DLA’s collection. Search for Heidegger in their Manuscript collections is online here.

General information
 Political Texts – Rectoral Addresses
 W.J. Korab-Karpowicz, Martin Heidegger (1889–1976) in Internet Encyclopedia of Philosophy
 Karl Löwith, My Last Meeting with Heidegger, Rome 1936
 German Heidegger Society 
 Arne D. Naess, Jr., Martin Heidegger in Encyclopædia Britannica
 Martin Heidegger, Der Spiegel Interview by Rudolf Augstein and Georg Wolff, 23 September 1966; published May 31 1976 
 Heidegger's Notebooks Renew Focus on Anti-Semitism

Works by Heidegger
 English translations of Heidegger's works
 

 
1889 births
1976 deaths
20th-century German philosophers
Antisemitism in Germany
Anti-Masonry
Conservative Revolutionary movement
Continental philosophers
Daseinsanalysis
Infectious disease deaths in Germany
Enactive cognition
Epistemologists
Existentialists
German anti-communists
German fascists
German medievalists 
German Army personnel of World War I
German Roman Catholics
Hermeneutists
Members of the Academy for German Law
Metaphysicians
Nazi Party members
Nietzsche scholars
Ontologists
People from Meßkirch
People from the Grand Duchy of Baden
Phenomenologists
Philosophers of art
Philosophers of culture
Philosophers of history
Philosophers of language
Philosophers of nihilism
Philosophers of religion
Philosophers of technology
Political philosophers
German social commentators
Social philosophers
Theorists on Western civilization
University of Freiburg alumni
Academic staff of the University of Freiburg
Academic staff of the University of Marburg
Volkssturm personnel
Philosophers of death